Dale Shaw (born April 9, 1964) is a former American stock car racing driver. Shaw competed in 45 NASCAR Xfinity Series races between 1987 and 1999, achieving 9 top ten finishes. He also competed in 270 ARCA Menards Series East races between 1987 and 2005, winning 19 races and reaching the top ten 139 times. He also won the series' 1994 title, doing so without winning a single race, making him the only driver to do so in NASCAR history (at the time he won the title, the series was known as the Busch East Series) until Austin Dillon won the then-Nationwide Series title in 2013.

Motorsports career results

NASCAR 
(key) (Bold – Pole position awarded by qualifying time. Italics – Pole position earned by points standings or practice time. * – Most laps led.)

Busch Series

Craftsman Truck Series

References

External links
 

1964 births
Living people
NASCAR drivers
Racing drivers from New Hampshire